Phostria atrisignalis is a moth in the family Crambidae. It was described by George Hampson in 1912. It is found in Singapore.

References

Phostria
Moths described in 1912
Moths of Asia